Periyakulam taluk is a taluk of Theni district of the Indian state of Tamil Nadu. The headquarters of the taluk is the town of Periyakulam.

Demographics
According to the 2011 census, the taluk of Periyakulam had a population of 215,979 with 109,863  males and 106,116 females. There were 966 women for every 1000 men. The taluk had a literacy rate of 70.85. Child population in the age group below 6 was 10,100 Males and 9,416 Females.

References 

Taluks of Theni district